Rebecca Kellogg Ashley (December 22, 1695 – August 1757) was an English child captured by allied French, Canadian militia, Iroquois, and Algonquin soldiers in the 1704 Deerfield Raid. The Deerfield attack was part of the decade-long Queen Anne's War (the 1702-1713 War of Spanish Succession on the Continent). Rebecca was eight years old. Eunice Williams was captured in this same raid, as was her father, John Williams who wrote about his captive experience in The Redeemed Captive. Like Eunice and several other children from Deerfield, Rebecca Kellogg was adopted by Haudenosaunee Mohawks in the town of Kahnawake. She married and she raised children.

Unlike Eunice, Rebecca Kellogg returned to British colonial territory as an older woman. She married Ben Ashley and she translated for several Congregational missionaries in Indian missions, including Jonathan Edwards at the Stockbridge Indian Mission. Edwards expressed in many letters his admiration of her faith and of her interpretation skills. Although she had left Kahnawake, she often lived with the Haudenosaunee and identified as a member of the Mohawk. Rebecca Kellogg Ashley died in 1757 with the Oneida Haudenosaunee in Oquaga, New York. She did not leave any writings that are known but her life is visible in the writings of the missionaries with whom she worked. Gideon Hawley wrote that the Haudenosaunee "greatly lamented" her death.

References 

 
 
 

1757 deaths
Captives of Native Americans
Queen Anne's War
Iroquois
Algonquian peoples
1695 births
People of colonial Massachusetts